The Holocaust Museum Houston is located in Houston's Museum District, in Texas. It is the fourth largest holocaust museum in the U.S. It was opened in 1996.

The Boniuk Center houses Holocaust Museum Houston's Education Department, including four classrooms, staff offices, storage rooms, and a library. The Holocaust Museum Houston Engines of Change Student Ambassador Program introduces Houston-area high school students to Holocaust history and enables them to better understand current issues and to develop their own informed opinions and voices. The Educator in Motion program is a free school and community outreach program that provides educational programming on the Holocaust, genocide, social justice, and active citizenship in school and community settings. The museum, working with colleagues from the Anti-Defamation League Southwest Region and the Houston Police Department, offers training for recruits, in-service, and command-level law enforcement officers in this day-long session. Another educational resource the museum offers are the Digital Curriculum Trunks.

Facilities

First Floor 
Morgan Family Welcome Center

Patrons enter the museum via the Morgan Family Welcome Center, which includes an orientation film and exhibition materials in English and Spanish.

Bearing Witness: A Community Remembers

The permanent Holocaust Gallery contains the testimony of Holocaust survivors who later settled in the Houston area, featuring artifacts donated by the survivors, their descendants, liberators, and other collectors. The exhibit also educates visitors about Jewish and non-Jewish resistance efforts, including the Warsaw Ghetto uprising, prisoner revolts, sabotage, the partisan movement, displaced person camps, and life after the Holocaust.

World War II-era Railcar and the 1940s Danish Rescue Boat

Placed next to each other in the Holocaust Gallery is a fishing boat like those used by Danish fishermen to ferry Jewish neighbors to neutral territory and a World War II-era railcar like the ones that transported Jews to concentration camps and killing centers. As part of the museum's expansion, these artifacts were brought inside the permanent Holocaust Gallery to protect them from the elements.

Dimensions in Testimony

USC Shoah Foundation’s Dimensions in Testimony exhibition, featuring Houston-area Holocaust survivor William J. "Bill" Morgan, allows visitors to have "virtual conversations" with Holocaust survivors by asking questions of their HD projections, which then answer in real-time via pre-recorded video images. Each recorded interview enables viewers to ask questions of the survivor about their life experiences and hear responses in real-time, lifelike conversation. Questions are answered  as if the survivor is in the room, and through AI, the more questions asked, the better the technology becomes. Dimensions in Testimony is housed in the permanent Holocaust Gallery.

Human Rights Gallery

The new Human Rights Gallery will feature educational displays of all UN-recognized genocides as well as tributes to international human rights leaders, including Malala Yousafzai and Martin Luther King Jr.

The Rhona and Bruce Caress Gallery – And Still I Write: Young Diarists on War and Genocide

And Still, I Write: Young Diarists on War and Genocide highlights the diaries of young people who wrote during war and genocide. The Gallery features six interactive diaries stations with 12 diarist stories rotating between them to educate visitors about the very personal stories of the Holocaust, as well as the existing dangers of hatred, prejudice, and apathy. Visitors will be able to access and utilize these electronic diaries, providing them with the unique use of interactive, experiential technology. In addition, the Gallery will include a historical exhibit on Anne Frank.

Two Changing Galleries

The museum also includes two changing galleries for art and photography exhibits. The Central Gallery is naturally located in the center of the museum building. The Josef and Edith Mincberg Gallery is a larger hall for more extensive displays.

Lack Family Memorial Room

The Lack Family Memorial Room is a quiet place for contemplation. It contains a three-part work of art comprising the Wall of Remembrance, the Wall of Tears, and the Wall of Hope. The Memorial Wall is where local Holocaust survivors can commemorate their lost loved ones.

Eric Alexander Garden of Hope

Outside the Memorial Room is a quiet garden known as the Eric Alexander Garden of Hope. It is dedicated to the eternal spirit of children and is in memory of the one and a half million children who lost their lives in the Holocaust.

Second Floor 
The Jerold B. Katz Family Butterfly Loft

Suspended as if in flight, the Butterfly Loft sculpture is a kaleidoscope of 1,500 butterflies that connects all three floors of the museum in an organically shaped swarm. Each butterfly represents 1,000 children and together is a memorial to the 1.5 million children murdered in the Holocaust.

The Boniuk Center for the Future of Holocaust, Human Rights, and Genocide Studies – Second Floor

The Boniuk Center for the Future of Holocaust, Human Rights, and Genocide Studies provides research and a scholarly forum to consider how to best educate our community and others around the world about the history of the Holocaust.

Samuel Bak Gallery

The museum will debut the nation's largest gallery of artwork by Holocaust survivor and painter Samuel Bak, with more than 130 works in exhibition rotation. The gallery itself is circular, continuously displaying the exceptional work of the artist while teaching children and adults to apply an understanding of the events of the Holocaust and other genocides to their own lives and respond to them successfully by developing social resiliency.

Third Floor 
The Boniuk Library

The expansion of The Boniuk Library, with more than 10,000 volumes and numerous resources for in-house research and education, allows for enhanced public access to its 285 oral testimonies for research purposes and genealogical searches. The Boniuk Library is one of the largest sources of data in the U.S. for communities destroyed during the Holocaust.

Museum renovation 
In June 2019, Holocaust Museum Houston underwent a $34 million expansion of its original building in the Houston Museum District. The new three-story structure houses a welcome center, four permanent galleries and two changing exhibition galleries, classrooms, a research library, a café, a 200-seat indoor theater, and a 175-seat outdoor amphitheater. The exhibits now discuss the overall history surrounding the Holocaust, as well as other genocides. Some items were moved to protect them during construction,including the rescue boat “Hanne Frank" and a railcar.

Moral Courage Award
In 1994, HMH introduced the Lyndon Baines Johnson Moral Courage Award in memory of the 36th president of the United States. Recipients of this award are individuals who, like Johnson, exhibit moral courage, individual responsibility, and the willingness to take action against injustice. The 2009 award honored U.S. Sen. John McCain for his heroism in the face of extreme adversity during the Vietnam War.

Gallery

See also 

 History of the Jews in Houston

References

External links

 Austrian Holocaust Memorial Service
 Holocaust Museum Houston
 Lyndon Baines Johnson Moral Courage Award

1996 establishments in Texas
Ethnic museums in Texas
Holocaust museums in Texas
Museums established in 1996
Museums in Houston